TAP Edge (stylized as tap EDGE) is a 24-hour Philippine pay television channel owned by TAP Digital Media Ventures Corporation.

The channel airs a variety of entertainment genres focusing on action/suspense and crime dramas.

History
Prior to the launch, TAP DMV signed a joint venture/brand licensing agreement with U.S.-based global media company IMG to carry the EDGEsport programming to the Philippines.

On February 1, 2018, EDGEsport Philippines was officially launched via Sky Cable, and was the first cable channel of TAP DMV. It broadcasts the same format of its international counterpart, offering action/combat sports and adventure/outdoor lifestyle programs.

On February 17, 2020, as part of TAP DMV's restructure on its channels, EDGEsport was relaunched as TAP Edge.

On November 15, 2020, the channel began its transition to reformat as an action/drama-oriented entertainment channel, with EDGEsport and other action sports programming made its final broadcast in December 2020.

Programming
TAP Edge's current schedule consists of canned programming with distribution/output arrangements from Comcast (NBCUniversal, Peacock, and Sky UK) and ITV Studios. Programming includes news, current affairs/newsmagazines, action and suspense dramas, crime dramas, reality shows, sports reality and movies.

Current programs
 Dateline NBC
 Judge Jerry
 Chicago Fire
 Chicago P.D.
 Chicago Med
 Chicago Justice
 Fargo
 Bulletproof
 Riviera
 Rig 45
 Transplant
 Intelligence
 Treadstone
 Urban Myths A Discovery of Witches Gangs of London The Magicians The Purge American Greed Bloodline Detectives World on Fire The Titan Games The Capture Celebrity Obsessed Temple COBRA Straight Up Steve Austin World's Most Unexplained The Real Story of... Bodyguard Britannia Krypton Code 404 The Equalizer Noughts + Crosses The Night Manager Suits Ordinary Joe The Sinner Killing Eve New Amsterdam Good GirlsFormer programs
 EDGEsport
 Impact Wrestling WWE Afterburn WWE Main Event This Week in WWE Reel Deal (formerly TAP Edge Weekend Movies)
 NBC Nightly News''

References

English-language television stations in the Philippines
Television channels and stations established in 2018
Men's interest channels
Television networks in the Philippines
2018 establishments in the Philippines
TAP Digital Media Ventures Corporation